Rio Bananal is a municipality located in the Brazilian state of Espírito Santo. Its population was 19,271 (2020) and its area is 642 km².

References

Municipalities in Espírito Santo